The Tulks Volcanic Belt is a volcanic belt located in the central interior of the island of  Newfoundland in the Canadian province of Newfoundland and Labrador. It contains felsic volcanic rocks and pyroclastic rocks with minor mafic and sedimentary rocks.

See also
Volcanism of Canada
Volcanism of Eastern Canada
List of volcanoes in Canada

References

Volcanism of Newfoundland and Labrador
Volcanic belts